Echinopora is a genus of stony corals in the family Merulinidae.

Species 
The following species are currently recognized:

 Echinopora ashmorensis Veron, 1990
 Echinopora forskaliana (Milne Edwards & Haime, 1849)
 Echinopora fruticulosa Klunzinger, 1879
 Echinopora gemmacea (Lamarck, 1816)
 Echinopora hirsutissima Milne Edwards & Haime, 1849
 Echinopora horrida Dana, 1846
 Echinopora irregularis Veron, Turak & DeVantier, 2000
 Echinopora lamellosa (Esper, 1795)
 Echinopora mammiformis (Nemenzo, 1959)
 Echinopora pacificus Veron, 1990
 Echinopora robusta Veron, 2000
 Echinopora spinulosa Brüggemann
 Echinopora tiranensis Veron, Turak & DeVantier, 2000

References 

Merulinidae
Scleractinia genera